Paulien Couckuyt (born 19 May 1997) is a Belgian track and field athlete who specializes in middle-distance running and 400 metres hurdles. She represented Belgium at the 2019 World Athletics Championships, competing in women's 400 metres hurdles and women's 4 × 400 metres relay.

References

External links

Belgian female middle-distance runners
Belgian female hurdlers
1997 births
Living people
World Athletics Championships athletes for Belgium
Athletes (track and field) at the 2020 Summer Olympics
Olympic athletes of Belgium
21st-century Belgian women